Blowitz may refer to:

 
 Henri Blowitz, Bohemian journalist